Anthony Marion (born 12 January 1994) is a French professional rugby league footballer who plays as a  for Toulouse Olympique in the Betfred Championship and France at international level. 

He can also play  or in the halves. Marion was the back-up goal-kicker to Mark Kheirallah for Toulouse in the Championship.

Background
Marion came through the youth system at RC Albi.

Club career

Toulouse Olympique
Marion joined the Toulouse "Centre du Formation" in the summer of 2014 from Albi. He made his debut for Toulouse in Elite 2 in 2014/15 and then seized his opportunity later in the season to progress to the first team, due to injuries to more senior players. Marion signed his first contract with TO alongside Maxime Puech in July 2015.

At the end of the 2014/15 season, Toulouse had decided to move the first team to play in the English competition. With the next English season not due to commence until March 2016, Marion played the first half of the 2015/16 season in Elite 1 for Toulouse Olympique Broncos, the Toulouse reserve side who had taken their place in the French competition. In January 2016, Marion joined up with the first team for the 2016 campaign.

2016 was Toulouse's first season back in the English competition. They finished the season top of Kingstone Press League 1 but lost the promotion final to Rochdale Hornets before managing to secure promotion to the Championship for 2017. Marion played in 26 matches in total, scoring five tries in a season that saw him cement his place in the first team and secure a contract for 2017. 

Marion, alongside Clément Boyer, made the most appearances for TO in 2017, playing in 32 out of 34 matches and scoring 5 tries. On 7 October 2017, it was confirmed that he had been retained for the 2018 season.

In 2018, Marion played 28 times, scoring 8 tries, and earned his first call up to the full France national rugby league team. His durability and utility value (able to play in the halves, at hooker and loose-forward) was rewarded when TO announced on 10 January 2019, that he had been retained for the 2019 season.

The 2019 season saw Toulouse finish second in the table and lose out to fifth-placed Featherstone Rovers in the preliminary final. Marion played in all 27 regular-season games and the three play-off matches, a feat matched only by skipper Con Mika. He scored a personal record 13 tries and also kicked 15 goals as back-up to Mark Kheirallah. In the final game of the 2019 season against Featherstone, Marion suffered a serious ankle injury. Despite the injury, Toulouse announced on 29 November 2019 that Marion had been retained for the 2020 season. Due to his injury, he did not play at all in the short 2020 RFL Championship that was subsequently cancelled due to COVID-19.

On 7 September 2020, Toulouse announced that Marion had signed a new contract that would keep him at the club until 2022. In 2021, he played in 13 of Toulouse's 15 games, scoring 6 tries and kicking 27 goals. He wore the squad number 13 and played most of his matches at loose-forward.

On 4 November 2021 it was announced that Marion would remain with the club until the end of the 2022 season.

Club statistics

International career

France
Marion made his debut for France in 2018, coming off the bench in the 44-6 defeat to England at Leigh. He retained his place in the France squad for the 2018 Rugby League European Championship that autumn but didn't play in either victory against Wales or Ireland which saw France qualify for the 2021 Rugby League World Cup. Marion earned his second cap, scoring a try in the 28-10 victory over Scotland in Carcassonne in France's final match of the Championship.

Marion missed France's tour to Australia at the end of the 2019 season due to a serious ankle injury sustained in the Championship Preliminary Final 12-36 defeat to Featherstone Rovers in the final game of the season. Marion made his third appearance for France in the 10-30 defeat to England in Perpignan in 2021.

International statistics

References

External links
Toulouse Olympique profile
France profile
French profile

1994 births
Living people
French rugby league players
France national rugby league team players
Rugby league hookers
Toulouse Olympique Broncos players
Toulouse Olympique players